Love Is Free is a "mini-album" by Robyn & La Bagatelle Magique, released on 7 August 2015 by the record labels Konichiwa, Cherrytree, and Interscope.

"Tell You (Today)" was originally released in September 2014 and is a cover of the 1983 disco song "Tell You Today" by Loose Joints, written by that group's founding member Arthur Russell. It originally appeared on the Red Hot tribute album to him, Master Mix: Red Hot + Arthur Russell, in October 2014.

Primarily a dance, electropop, and house record, Love Is Free features influences of disco, Italo disco, and acid house.

Critical reception

Love Is Free received generally positive reviews from music critics. At Metacritic, which assigns a normalized rating out of 100 to reviews from mainstream critics, the album received an average score of 73, which indicates "generally favorable reviews", based on 12 reviews.

Track listing

Notes
 signifies an additional producer

Charts

Release history

References

2015 EPs
Cherrytree Records albums
Interscope Records EPs
Robyn albums